The Coree (also Connamox, Cores, Corennines, Connamocksocks, Coranine Indians, Neuse River Indians) were a very small Native American tribe, who once occupied a coastal area south of the Neuse River in southeastern North Carolina in the area now covered by Carteret and Craven counties. Early 20th-century scholars were unsure of what language they spoke, but the coastal areas were mostly populated by Iroquois and Algonquian peoples.

History

The Coree were not described by English colonists until 1701, by which time their population had already been reduced to as few as 125 members, likely due to epidemics of infectious disease and warfare.  In the early 18th century, the Coree and several other tribes were allied with the Iroquoian Tuscarora against the colonists.  In 1711, they participated in the Tuscarora War, trying to drive out the English settlers. The Native Americans were unsuccessful and suffered many fatalities.

By 1715, some Coree merged with the remaining members of the nearby Algonquian Machapunga and Tuscarora people and settled in their single village of Mattamuskeet in present-day Hyde County.  This was on the shore of Lake Mattamuskeet.  Other Coree remained in Carteret county (especially in isolated areas such as Indian Beach, Atlantic Beach, Harkers Island- formerly known as Craney Island, Core Creek, and swamp lands).  Descendants gradually married and assimilated into the European-American and African-American populations.

Although in the 20th century, some people claim individual descent from the historical Coree. Some observers believe that current attempts to claim Coree descent are by people who were among what anthropologists called "tri-racial isolates," often of majority European and African descent.

Language

The ethnographer James Mooney speculated that the Coree were related to the Iroquoian Cherokee, but he did not have convincing evidence. According to limited colonial reports, they spoke a language that did not appear to be mutually intelligible with any of the three major language stocks (Carolina Algonquian, Iroquoian Tuscarora, and Waccamaw Siouan or Woccon) to John Lawson, who described Coree after recording vocabularies of the other three.

On the other hand, the Coree occupied territory that was historically mostly that of Tuscaroras, which suggests they were affiliated with these peoples.  The name Coree may be the singular form of the Carolina Algonquian name Cwareuuoc.

References

Bibliography
 Ives Goddard. (2005). "The indigenous languages of the Southeast", Anthropological Linguistics, 47 (1), 1–60.
 Ruth Y. Wetmore (1975), "First on the Land: The North Carolina Indians" .

Native American tribes in North Carolina
Carteret County, North Carolina
Craven County, North Carolina
Hyde County, North Carolina
Extinct languages of North America
Extinct Native American peoples
Unclassified languages of North America